A Régiséggyüjtö (translation: The Antiquarian) is a 1918 short comedy Hungarian film directed by Alfréd Deésy and featuring Béla Lugosi and Norbert Dan. The film's title could also translate as The Antique Dealer.

Cast
 Norbert Dán
 Béla Lugosi (credited as Arisztid Olt)
 Camilla von Hollay (credited as Kamilla Hollay)
 Miklos Ujvari

See also
 Béla Lugosi filmography

References

External links

1917 films
1917 short films
Hungarian black-and-white films
Hungarian silent short films
Films directed by Alfréd Deésy
Austro-Hungarian films